State Route 113 (SR 113) is an unsigned primary state highway in the U.S. state of Virginia.  The state highway runs  from U.S. Route 11E (US 11E), US 19, US 421, and SR 381 north to US 11 and US 19 within Bristol.

Route description

SR 113 begins at a one-way pair at separate intersections with Commonwealth Avenue, which carries US 11E, US 19, US 421, and SR 381, north of downtown Bristol.  SR 113 heads east from Commonwealth Avenue along Cumberland Street and west toward the avenue as Sycamore Street, both of which are two-way streets.  Northbound SR 113 meets US 421 again at the corner of Cumberland Street and Piedmont Avenue; US 421 heads south on Piedmont and east on Commonwealth while SR 113 turns north on Piedmont.  One block to the north at Sycamore Street, the one-way pair ends and both directions of the state highway follow Piedmont Avenue.  The state highway passes under a rail line then veers northeast onto Oakview Avenue, which passes to the west of the former Virginia Intermont College.  Just north of the college, SR 113 intersects Moore Street and the northern end of Martin Luther King Jr. Boulevard, which carries US 11 Truck and US 19 Truck.  The state highway and the two truck routes continue on Moore Street north to their concurrent termini at US 11 and US 19, which head west as Euclid Avenue and northeast as Lee Highway.

Major intersections

References

External links

Virginia Highways Project: VA 113

113
State Route 113